László Munteán (30 November 1935 – 3 May 1983) was a Hungarian rower. He competed in two events at the 1960 Summer Olympics.

References

1935 births
1983 deaths
Hungarian male rowers
Olympic rowers of Hungary
Rowers at the 1960 Summer Olympics
Rowers from Budapest